Christine Trujillo is an American politician and a Democratic member of the New Mexico House of Representatives representing District 25 since January 15, 2013.

Education
Trujillo earned her BA in Education from New Mexico Highlands University and her MA in education from the University of New Mexico.

Elections
2012 When District 25 incumbent Democratic Representative Danice Picraux retired and left the seat open, Trujillo ran in the three-way June 5, 2012 Democratic Primary and won with 1,652 votes (62.2%) and won the November 6, 2012 General election with 8,383 votes (63.1%) against Republican nominee Elisabeth Keen.
2002 Trujillo was unopposed for the District 3 New Mexico Board of Education Democratic Primary and won a four-year term in the November 5, 2002 General election against Republican nominee Mary Gilbert.

References

External links
Official page at the New Mexico Legislature

Christine Trujillo at Ballotpedia
Christine Trujillo at the National Institute on Money in State Politics

Place of birth missing (living people)
Year of birth missing (living people)
Living people
Hispanic and Latino American state legislators in New Mexico
Hispanic and Latino American women in politics
Democratic Party members of the New Mexico House of Representatives
Politicians from Albuquerque, New Mexico
New Mexico Highlands University alumni
University of New Mexico alumni
Women state legislators in New Mexico
21st-century American politicians
21st-century American women politicians